54 Cancri is a star in the zodiac constellation of Cancer. It has an apparent visual magnitude of 6.38, which places it just below the normal brightness limit of stars visible to the naked eye. The annual parallax shift is 24.79 mas as measured from Earth's orbit, which yields a distance estimate of about 132 light years. It is moving away from the Sun with a radial velocity of +45 km/s.

Measurement of the stars proper motion over time suggest changes due to an acceleration component, which may indicate it is a close binary system. The visible component has a stellar classification of G5 V, indicating it is an ordinary G-type main-sequence star that is generating energy through hydrogen fusion in its core region. Hall et al. (2007) classify it as a low-activity variable star. The star is about five billion years old with a projected rotational velocity of 3.1 km/s. It has 1.23 times the mass of the Sun and 1.81 times the Sun's radius.

References

G-type main-sequence stars
Cancer (constellation)
Durchmusterung objects
Cancri, 54
075528
043454
3510